Oleh Borysovych Oryekhov (born 20 August 1967) is a former Ukrainian football referee in the Ukrainian Premier League. He also officiated at international matches.

References

External links
 World Referee - Biography

1967 births
Living people
Ukrainian football referees
Sportspeople from Kyiv